Bridge of Orchy is a village in Glen Orchy in Argyll and Bute, Scotland. It is named after the crossing over the River Orchy, which was constructed by British Army during the pacification of the Highland Clans following the Battle of Culloden in 1746. Military roads were built between the Scottish Lowlands and Highlands of northern Scotland to facilitate the speedy movement of Crown forces.

The village, which is dated to 1751, is on the A82 road. The nearby Bridge of Orchy railway station opened on the West Highland Line in 1894.

The  West Highland Way long-distance trail runs through the village. Nearby prominent peaks include the munros Beinn Dorain and Beinn an Dòthaidh. The River Orchy is one of the finest white-water rivers in the United Kingdom.

References

External links

Villages in Argyll and Bute
1751 establishments in Scotland